Deta Hedman (born 14 November 1959) is an English darts player who plays in World Darts Federation (WDF) events.

Biography
Hedman was born in Jamaica, West Indies Federation, in 1959. Her parents emigrated to the United Kingdom in the early 1960s, leaving Hedman and her siblings in the care of relatives in Jamaica. She spent her childhood with her aunt in Castleton in a shack without running water or electricity, going to school from Monday to Thursday and working on the farm on Fridays. Her parents eventually settled in Witham, Essex and over time, brought their children to the UK, with Hedman joining them in January 1973. She started playing darts with her older brother after babysitting for him and then at the local pub in Witham and further afield in Essex. When she was 25, she joined a super league. She was selected for the county, and in 1987 she began playing in British Darts Organisation events.

Career

Hedman reached the Women's World Masters final for the first time in 1990, losing to Rhian Speed. She beat defending champion Mandy Solomons to win the Women's World Masters in 1994. When she retired from darts in 1997 due to work commitments, she had been Women's World Number 1 since 1994.

Hedman returned to darts in 2002 with the Professional Darts Corporation. She qualified for the UK Open in 2004, and more famously in 2005, when she defeated Aaron Turner and Norman Fletcher before losing to Wayne Atwood in the last 64. Her win over Turner was the first time that a female darts player had beaten a male player in a televised major.

Due to work commitments, Hedman retired again in 2007 but returned to the BDO in 2009. After winning numerous open titles in 2009, she qualified for the BDO Women's World Championship for the first time in 2010. She defeated Irina Armstrong 2–0 in the quarter-finals, but was beaten 2–0 by eventual champion Trina Gulliver in the semi-finals. Hedman won the 2010 BDO Classic tournament beating Karen Lawman 3-2 in the final.

Hedman also competed in the first PDC Women's World Darts Championship in 2010, but lost to Fiona Carmichael in the quarter-finals.

At the 2011 BDO World Darts Championship, Hedman defeated Belgium's Patricia De Peuter 2–1 in the quarter-finals before being whitewashed 2–0 by Rhian Edwards in the semi-finals.

Hedman's best run at the BDO World Darts Championship came in 2012, where she beat Rhian Edwards and Lorraine Farlam to reach the final. In the final, she led Anastasia Dobromyslova by a set and threw for the championship, but was broken and ultimately lost 2–1. This was equalled by her 2016 run where she lost in the final to Trina Gulliver.

Despite being ranked No.1 for the 2013 BDO World Darts Championship Hedman was knocked out in the first round 0–2 by Lisa Ashton. The following season, Hedman won 14 titles and once again reached the world final, but lost once again this time from 2–0 in sets and 2–1 in legs having yet again thrown for the title. Hedman eventually lost the final 3–2 to Lisa Ashton despite having a checkout percentage over 75%.

Hedman reached the final of the 2016 BDO World Darts Championship but was beaten by Trina Gulliver who won her 10th title.

PDC
She competed for a tour card at the 2020 Q-School however she failed to gain a tour card. In October 2020 the PDC held the inaugural Women's Series, a set of 4 events with 2 qualifying spots for the 2021 PDC World Darts Championship. She tied with Fallon Sherrock on the Order of Merit, however Hedman won beating Sherrock 85–83 on legs won, meaning Hedman would make her debut in the 2021 PDC World Darts Championship. She would go onto lose 3–1 to Andy Boulton.

Awards
Hedman was on the list of the BBC's 100 Women announced on 23 November 2020.

World Championship results

PDC
 2010 (women's): Quarter-finals (lost to Fiona Carmichael 2–4)
 2021: First round (lost to Andy Boulton 1–3)

BDO/WDF

WSDT
 2022: First Round (lost to Peter Manley 1–3)

Personal life

Hedman's brother Rudi was a professional footballer playing for Colchester United and Crystal Palace. Her other brother, Al, was a professional darts player and former 1995 BDO British Open Champion. Her nephew Graham is a 400-metre runner.

References

External links
 Official site
 Profile and stats on Darts Database

English darts players
Jamaican darts players
1959 births
Living people
People from Witham
People from Kingston, Jamaica
English people of Jamaican descent
British Darts Organisation players
Professional Darts Corporation associate players
Professional Darts Corporation women's players
BBC 100 Women